This is a list of symbols of the U.S. state of Nevada. The majority of the items in the list are officially recognized symbols created by an act of the Nevada Legislature and signed into law by the governor.

Insignia

Flora

Fauna

Geology

Culture

See also

List of Nevada-related topics
Lists of United States state insignia
State of Nevada

References

External links
Nevada State Symbols

State symbols
Nevada